Aquilaria rostrata is a species of tree in the family Thymelaeaceae. It is endemic to Peninsular Malaysia. It is sometimes used for agarwood, but unsustainable harvesting is believed to be threatening agarwood-producing species and therefore is discouraged by environmental groups.

References

rostrata
Endemic flora of Peninsular Malaysia
Trees of Peninsular Malaysia
Critically endangered plants
Taxonomy articles created by Polbot